Kurt Pittner (born 5 March 1943) is an Austrian weightlifter. He competed at the 1968 Summer Olympics, the 1972 Summer Olympics and the 1976 Summer Olympics.

References

1943 births
Living people
Austrian male weightlifters
Olympic weightlifters of Austria
Weightlifters at the 1968 Summer Olympics
Weightlifters at the 1972 Summer Olympics
Weightlifters at the 1976 Summer Olympics
Sportspeople from Vienna
20th-century Austrian people